Anicadu is a village around 4 km from Mallapally town. It ia part of the Thiruvalla constituency. It belongs to the Pathanamthitta District.

Economy
Anicadu receives most of its income from rubber tree plantations and money remitted from Arabian countries.

Churches

Arohana Marthoma Church, Anicadu, Pullukuthy
St. Peter's & St Paul's Orthodox Church, Pathicadu.

References

Villages in Pathanamthitta district